"Immortal" is a song by Atlanta-based rapper 21 Savage, released on October 31, 2019.

Background
21 Savage previewed the song in the trailer for the video game Mortal Kombat 11 in early December 2018. It was originally speculated to appear on his second studio album, I Am > I Was, but when it did not occur, its release date was left undetermined. On August 10, 2019, Savage took to Twitter to tease the track's release, which occurred on October 31, 2019.

Lyrics
In the song, 21 raps about his murderous tendencies and also mentions names of characters in the Mortal Kombat video game series.

Charts

Certifications

References

2019 singles
2019 songs
21 Savage songs
Songs written by 21 Savage
Epic Records singles